Majin may refer to the following places:

 Majin, Ilam, Iran
 Majin District, in Ilam Province, Iran
 Majin Rural District, in Ilam Province, Iran
 Majin, Kurdistan, Iran
 Taebong, a Korean state known as Majin between 904 and 911

See also

 Majin Buu, an antagonist in the Dragon Ball series
 Majin and the Forsaken Kingdom, a video game
 Majin Bone, a Bandai card game, adapted into a manga and an anime
 Mashin Hero Wataru, a multimedia franchise
 Majin Tensei, a series of strategy video games
 Neko Majin, a manga series